The Theodore Roosevelt Digital Library is a repository of information on Theodore Roosevelt. It is online.

After his death in 1919, his family and admirers have from time to time, attempted to establish a Theodore Roosevelt Presidential Library and Museum. All have failed. The first attempt became a national historic site in New York City and the papers themselves were donated to Harvard University. There was another attempt in the 1990s near where Roosevelt had his home in Sagamore Hill, NY. The latest attempt is in North Dakota, where Roosevelt lived for a few years in the 1880s.

On April 30, 2013, the North Dakota Legislative Assembly passed a bill appropriating $12 million to Dickinson State University to award a grant to the Theodore Roosevelt Center for construction of a building to be named the Theodore Roosevelt Presidential Library. To access these funds, the Theodore Roosevelt Center must first raise $3 million from non-state sources. As of May 2017, the physical library is expected to be completed in 2019. The center is also home to the Theodore Roosevelt Digital Library which has formed partnerships with the Library of Congress and Harvard University, among other institutions. They currently have over 64,000 items online.

The Theodore Roosevelt Center digital library includes documents owned by Roosevelt, such as correspondence both to and from him, photographs, speeches, and his diaries and notes, as well as items about him such as newspaper and magazine articles and political cartoons. Audio recordings and films are also available for visitor use.

Among others, the participants in the digitization project include Dickinson State University, Harvard University, The Library of Congress, Mount Rushmore National Memorial, the Sagamore Hill National Historic Site, the Theodore Roosevelt Medora Foundation, the Gregory A. Wynn Theodore Roosevelt Collection, and the Theodore Roosevelt Birthplace, Inaugural Site, National Memorial, and National Park.

References

External links
 Theodore Roosevelt Digital Library

Theodore Roosevelt
Dickinson State University